Nick Ward (born 24 March 1985) is an Australian football (soccer) player, who plays as a midfielder for Pascoe Vale FC in the National Premier League.

Club career
His efforts in the inaugural A-League season of 2005–06 resulted in him becoming the first player to win the A-League's Rising Star Award with Perth Glory, along with also winning the Perth Supporter's Player of the Year, and also the Smokefree WA Coach's Award.

Following the end of the first A-League season, Nick Ward had trials with Leicester City and Brentford however, much to the disappointment of Football Federation Australia, he joined Queens Park Rangers in the English Championship prior to the 2006–07 season.

On 31 January 2007, the last day of the transfer window, Ward joined Brighton on loan for the remainder of the 2006–07 season. On 17 February 2007, Ward scored his first goal for the Albion in their 2–1 home win over Nottingham Forest before returning to Queens Park Rangers.

On 4 December 2007, Ward's contract with Queens Park Rangers was terminated by mutual consent. He joined Melbourne Victory before further signing on as the Victory's youth marquee in a two-year deal. On 11 January 2008, Ward scored his first goal for the Melbourne Victory in their 3–0 home win over Wellington Phoenix.

On 1 September 2010, it was announced that Ward had signed with the Wellington Phoenix for the remainder of the 2010/11 A-League season. On 11 September 2010, against Sydney FC, he scored his only goal for the Phoenix, a wonderful shot into the top right hand corner from outside the 18-yard box. Following the season, Ward was released from the Phoenix. Months after joining Iraklis Thessaloniki, Ward returned to the Wellington Phoenix after the Greek team was relegated to the amateur divisions. Ward said, "I am delighted Ricki wanted me back and everything has fallen into place.

Ward rejoined Perth Glory for the 2012/13 Hyundai A-League Season, scoring his first goal since returning in the club's 3–2 win over the Newcastle Jets on 3 November 2012. He scored his second goal for the club against the Western Sydney Wanderers in the 87th minute, which finished in a 1–1 draw.

Ward, along with teammates Evan Berger, Dean Heffernan and Lewis Italiano were released by the Glory at the end of the 2012–13 A-League season. Ward unsuccessfully played a trial game for the Western Sydney Wanderers during the 2013–14 pre-season.

Ward signed with Newcastle Jets as injury cover at the end of December 2013.

On 28 February 2015, Ward signed with Western Sydney Wanderers, making his debut in a 3–0 loss to Melbourne Victory, and unfortunately for Ward, suffering an Anterior Cruciate Ligament tear.

Ward returned to football in June 2017, signing with National Premier Leagues Victoria side Bentleigh Greens.

In 2018, he moved to Indian I-League side NEROCA, and appeared in two league matches.

International career

After his season had concluded with Perth Glory, Ward was selected by Australia in an extended squad for its opening Asian Cup qualifier with Bahrain. Ward was named on the bench, but did not play on the field.

In December 2006 the then Socceroos manager Graham Arnold believed that Ward (lacking game time under the management of Queens Park Rangers at the time) should be playing continental European competitions (e.g. Belgium, Netherlands), where there was (in Arnold's opinion) better ball delivery and midfield play than in the English Championship. Those comments could be interpreted as a preliminary reason not to select Ward in forthcoming Socceroos friendlies at the time. Ward's absence from more recent squads could be attributed to his lack playing minutes at Melbourne Victory (due to injuries and club coach Ernie Merrick's preference for more experienced players in his positions) and the success of other similar young players in transitioning their career to European clubs (including Nick Carle, Dario Vidosic, Nikita Rukavytsya and Brett Holman).

His exclusion from the Olyroos squad for the 2008 Beijing Olympics was a major disappointment especially after being a regular squad member under coach Rob Baan in Australia's qualification path.

Club career statistics

Honours
With Melbourne Victory:
 A-League Championship: 2008–2009
 A-League Premiership: 2008–2009
With Perth Glory:
 NSL Championship: 2003–2004
Personal honours:
 A-League Young Player of the Year: 2005–2006
 Perth Glory Member's Player of the Year: 2005–2006

References

External links
 Melbourne Victory profile
 FFA – Olyroo profile
 

1985 births
Living people
Soccer players from Perth, Western Australia
Australian soccer players
Australian expatriate soccer players
Australian expatriate sportspeople in England
A-League Men players
English Football League players
Brighton & Hove Albion F.C. players
Melbourne Victory FC players
Perth Glory FC players
Wellington Phoenix FC players
Western Sydney Wanderers FC players
Newcastle Jets FC players
Queens Park Rangers F.C. players
Bentleigh Greens SC players
National Soccer League (Australia) players
Articles containing video clips
NEROCA FC players
I-League 2nd Division players
Association football midfielders
Stirling Macedonia FC players